John Patrick McCarthy  (born 27 November 1956) is a British journalist, writer and broadcaster, and one of the hostages in the Lebanon hostage crisis. McCarthy was the United Kingdom's longest-held hostage in Lebanon, where he was a prisoner for more than five years.

Career
He attended Lochinver House School, then Haileybury and Imperial Service College, Hertfordshire, and read American Studies at the University of Hull.

McCarthy was a journalist working for United Press International Television News at the time of his kidnap by Islamic Jihad terrorists in Lebanon. He had recently arrived in Beirut when on 17 April 1986, two days after USAF airstrikes on Libya, WTN ordered him to leave. He was being escorted to the airport when a group of gunmen intercepted his car. He was held in captivity until release on 8 August 1991. He shared a cell with the Irish hostage Brian Keenan for several years. While a prisoner, he learned that his girlfriend, Jill Morrell, was actively campaigning for his release, launching a group called "Friends of John McCarthy".

By the time of McCarthy's release, his mother Sheila had died of cancer, unaware of his fate. Following his release, he co-wrote, with Morrell, a memoir of his years in captivity, entitled Some Other Rainbow. Their relationship ended four years later, and he married Anna Ottewill, a photographer, on 16 April 1999. They have a daughter.

In 1995 John McCarthy sailed around the coast of Britain with Sandi Toksvig, making a BBC documentary TV series and a book of the experience. McCarthy had attended university with Toksvig's brother, Nick. He co-presented the BBC Radio 4 programme Excess Baggage, also with Sandi Toksvig. On 29 March 2014, McCarthy hosted the ceremony for the "I Do To Equal Marriage" event which celebrated the introduction of same-sex marriage in England and Wales. Toksvig renewed her vows to her civil partner at the event.

Honours and affiliations
McCarthy is a Patron of Freedom from Torture (formerly the Medical Foundation for the Care of Victims of Torture), and has been awarded an honorary D.Litt. from his alma mater, the University of Hull, where a students' union bar (now an ice cream parlour) is named after him.

He was appointed a CBE in 1992.

Media references
The set of Series 1 of Drop the Dead Donkey, first aired in 1990, included a copy of a "Wanted" poster with McCarthy's photograph released during the campaign on his behalf. It is displayed on the wall in the news room and is frequently in shot, but not mentioned in the programme.
The 1993 HBO film Hostages, starring Colin Firth as McCarthy, was a fictionalised account of the Lebanon hostage crisis.
A critically acclaimed film version of his and Keenan's kidnapping and incarceration was made in 2003. Titled Blind Flight, the British film was directed by John Furse starring Ian Hart as Keenan and Linus Roache as McCarthy.
In 2006 McCarthy collaborated with the composer Adam Gorb and the librettist Ben Kaye to create Thoughts Scribbled on a Blank Wall, an exploration of the mental torture he underwent during his long incarceration. Commissioned by JAM (John Armitage Memorial), the work premiered in Fleet Street to critical acclaim in 2007 and was described by BBC Radio 3's Sean Rafferty as "Powerful stuff. A protest Cantata, the first of a genre." Thoughts Scribbled on a Blank Wall was scheduled for CD release in 2011.
The Stiff Little Fingers song Beirut Moon was inspired by McCarthy's ordeal. It criticized the government for not acting to free him and was subsequently withdrawn from sale.
A major Sky Arts series, Art of Faith, presented by McCarthy, was broadcast in 2008. The series, produced by Illuminations, was an exploration of the art and architecture of Islam, Christianity and Judaism. In 2009, production of a follow up series of Art of Faith began, featuring Buddhism, Hinduism and religions of the Tao.

Books

Books about McCarthy
An Evil Cradling; by Brian Keenan (McCarthy is a main character) Penguin Books

See also
 Lebanese Civil War
 Lebanon hostage crisis
 Le Commodore Hotel Beirut
 List of kidnappings
 Terry Waite

References

External links
BBC: Beirut hostage John McCarthy freed
 John McCarthy Official Website Corporate Speaking
 Bio at Jeremy Hicks Associates

1956 births
1980s missing person cases
Alumni of the University of Hull
BBC World Service presenters
British male journalists
British people taken hostage
Commanders of the Order of the British Empire
English male non-fiction writers
Foreign hostages in Lebanon
Formerly missing people
Journalists from Kingston upon Hull
Kidnappings by Islamists
Living people
Missing person cases in Lebanon
People educated at Haileybury and Imperial Service College
People educated at Lochinver House School
People from Hertfordshire
Place of birth missing (living people)